Eddie Parker (born 28 May 1959 in Liverpool, England) is an English jazz flutist and composer. He also plays keyboards during workshops and live performances.

Career
He was a founding member of and composer for the British jazz band Loose Tubes in the 1980s. He has toured and performed with several noted bands and performers including Bheki Mseleku, Marvin Smith and John Parricelli. He has toured with the band Mister Vertigo, of which Parricelli is also a member, and conducts jazz workshops and performances involving young musicians. He was a lecturer in jazz at Middlesex University, where his students included Led Bib.

Discography

As leader
 Live Tracks with Freebop (Impetus, 1988)
 Transformations of the Lamp (FMR, 1994)
 Everything You Do to Me (FMR, 1996)

With Loose Tubes
Loose Tubes (Loose Tubes Limited, 1985)
 Delightful Precipice (Loose Tubes Limited, 1986)
Open Letter (Editions EG, 1988)
 Dancing On Frith Street (Lost Marble, 2010)
 Sad Afrika (Lost Marble, 2012)
Arriving (Lost Marble, 2015)

As sideman
With Django Bates
 Music for the Third Policeman (Ah Um, 1990)
 Summer Fruits (and Unrest) (JMT, 1993)
 Winter Truce (and Homes Blaze) (JMT,/Verve 1995)

With others
 A Man Called Adam, Duende (Other, 1998)
 Keziah Jones, Blufunk Is a Fact! (Delabel, 1992)
 Bheki Mseleku, Celebration (World Circuit, 1992)
 Oumou Sangare, Ko Sira (World Circuit, 1993)
 Trevor Walters, Walters Gold with Love (Adelphi 1985)

References

External links
 

1959 births
Living people
English jazz flautists
English jazz composers
Male jazz composers
English male composers
Loose Tubes members
FMR Records artists